Shanga may refer to:

Shanga (singer), Nigerian-Swiss singer and songwriter
Shanga, Pate Island, an archeological site in Kenya on Pate Island
Shanga, Nigeria, a local government area in Kebbi State